The 2021–22 American Athletic Conference men's basketball season began with practices in October 2021, followed by the start of the 2021–22 NCAA Division I men's basketball season on November 9, 2021. Conference play began December 15, 2021, and concluded with the 2022 American Athletic Conference men's basketball tournament, held March 10–13, 2022, at Dickies Arena in Fort Worth, Texas.

Scheduling returned to the previous format: an 18-game schedule in which every team in The American played eight of its 10 conference opponents twice and the other two opponents once—one at home and one on the road.

Previous season
Wichita State won the regular season championship. The 2021 American Athletic Conference men's basketball tournament was held at Dickies Arena in Fort Worth, Texas, which was won by Houston.  Houston and Wichita State received bids to the NCAA tournament. Wichita State lost in the First Four to Drake, while Houston advanced to the Final Four before losing to eventual National Champion Baylor. The conference finished 4–2 overall. Memphis and SMU received bids to the 2021 National Invitation Tournament. SMU lost to Boise State in the first round, while Memphis won the NIT defeating Mississippi State in the Championship game. The conference went 4–1 overall in the NIT.

Quentin Grimes from Houston and Tyson Etienne from Wichita State were named the co-AAC Players of the Year. Wichita State's Isaac Brown was named Coach of the Year.

Coaches

Coaching changes

Head coaches
Note: Stats are through the beginning of the season. All stats and records are from time at current school only. 

Notes:
 Overall and AAC records are from time at current school and are through the end of 2020–21 season. NCAA records include time at current school only.
 AAC records only, prior conference records not included.
*In current job

Preseason

Recruiting classes

Preseason watchlists
Below is a table of notable preseason watch lists.

Preseason media poll
On October 13, The American released the preseason Poll and other preseason awards.

Preseason All-AAC

Regular season

Conference matrix
This table summarizes the head-to-head results between teams in conference play, There were 3 games which were postponed that weren't made up, resulting in unbalanced conference schedules

Player of the week
Throughout the regular season, the American Athletic Conference named a player and rookie of the week.

All-AAC Awards and teams

Source:

Postseason

American Athletic Conference tournament

NCAA tournament

Two teams from the conference were selected to participate:

National Invitation tournament

One team from the conference was selected to participate:

NBA draft
The following list includes all AAC players who were drafted in the 2022 NBA draft.

References

2021–22 season